Marijn Elise Nijman (born 27 August 1985) is a Dutch former cricketer who played as an all-rounder, batting right-handed and bowling right-arm medium. She appeared in one Test match, 21 One Day Internationals and six Twenty20 Internationals for the Netherlands between 2005 and 2011.

Nijman was born in Groningen, and played her club cricket for Schiedam's Hermes-DVS. She made her senior debut for the Netherlands in 2004, and her One Day International (ODI) debut the following year, against Ireland. In 2007, Nijman was selected in the Dutch squad for its inaugural Test match. She was a regular in the team right up until it lost its ODI status at the 2011 World Cup Qualifier, which was her final international tournament. Nijman had little success at international level, but fared better in the Women's County Championship, including in 2010 scoring 99 from 58 balls against Cornwall.

References

External links
 

1985 births
Living people
Sportspeople from Groningen (city)
Dutch women cricketers
Netherlands women Test cricketers
Netherlands women One Day International cricketers
Netherlands women Twenty20 International cricketers